The 1912–13 season was the 39th season of competitive football played by Rangers.

Overview
Rangers played a total of 47 competitive matches during the 1912–13 season.

Results
All results are written with Rangers' score first.

Scottish League Division One

Inter City Midweek Football League

Scottish Cup

Appearances

See also
 1912–13 in Scottish football

References

Rangers F.C. seasons
Rangers
Scottish football championship-winning seasons